Girls on Top may refer to:

 Girls on Top (British TV series), a 1985–1986 British comedy television series
 MTV Girls on Top, a 2016 Indian television series
 Girls on Top (album), 2005 album by BoA, or its title track
 "Girls on Top" (song), 2000 song by Girl Thing
 Mädchen, Mädchen, a 2001 German film also known as Girls on Top
 Girls on Top, a pseudonym used by Richard X
Girls on Top, a South Korean girl group

See also
 Woman on top, sex position
 Woman on Top, 2000 romantic comedy film